Time is a studio album by Danish jazz guitarist Jakob Bro. The album is the second part of a trilogy which also includes Balladeering (2009) and December Song (2013). The trilogy was nominated for the Nordic Council Music Prize 2014.

Track listing 
"Nat" (4:39)
"Cirkler" (7:27)
"A Simple Premise" (3:06)
"Swimmer (5:22)
"Northern Blues" (7:13)
"Fiordlands" (4:15)
"Yellow" (6.17)
"Smaa Dyr" (3:32)

Personnel 

Jakob Bro – composer, producer, guitar
Bill Frisell – guitar
Lee Konitz – sax
Thomas Morgan – bass

References

Time
Jakob Bro albums